Scott Cohen may refer to:

 Scott Cohen (actor) (born 1961), American actor
 Scott Lee Cohen (born 1965), American politician from Illinois
 Scott Cohen (music industry executive)

See also

Cohen (surname)